Polynoxylin (trade name Anaflex in Egypt) is an antiseptic for local treatment of the skin and the mouth. It is a formaldehyde releasing antimicrobial polymer.

References 

Antimicrobials
Dental materials
Ureas